2015 in paleoentomology is a list of new fossil insect taxa that were described during the year 2016, as well as other significant discoveries and events related to paleoentomology that were scheduled to occur during the year.

New taxa

Coleoptera

Dermaptera

Dictyoptera

Diptera

Embioptera

Ephemeroptera

Hemipterans

Hymenopterans

Mecopterans

Megalopterans

Neuropterans

Odonata

Raphidioptera

Strepsiptera

Trichoptera

Other insects

Research
 A study on the recovery of insect herbivores after the Cretaceous–Paleogene extinction event as indicated by insect-feeding damage on fossil leaves from the Maastrichtian and Danian localities in Patagonia (Argentina) is published by Donovan et al. (2016).
 A study of the morphology of the surface microstructure of the wings, head and abdomen of the Carboniferous megasecopteran Brodioptera sinensis is published by Prokop, Pecharová & Ren (2016).
 A study on the anatomy of the respiratory and alimentary systems of Saurophthirus longipes is published by Strelnikova & Rasnitsyn (2016).
 New anatomical data on the fossil beetle Onthophilus intermedius, obtained by using X-ray computed tomography, is published by Schwermann et al. (2016).
 Setae comparable with setae of extant dermestid beetle larvae are described from the Cretaceous Burmese amber by Poinar & Poinar (2016).
 A second specimen of the Cretaceous mosquito Burmaculex antiquus is described by Borkent & Grimaldi (2016).
 A study of well-preserved kalligrammatid fossils from Middle Jurassic and Early Cretaceous sites in northeastern China, indicating that kalligrammatids convergently evolved some of the anatomical traits also present in butterflies, is published by Labandeira et al. (2016).
 Fossilized termite nests with preserved fungus gardens within them are described from the Oligocene Songwe Member of the Nsungwe Formation in the Rukwa Rift Basin (Tanzania) by Roberts et al. (2016).
 Chrysopoid larvae, myrmeleontoid (owlfly and nymphid) larvae and reduviid nymphs preserved carrying debris for camouflage are described from the Cretaceous Burmese, French and Lebanese ambers by Wang et al. (2016).
 A fossilized bee nest is described from the Buxton-Norlim Limeworks in South Africa by Parker, Hopley & Kuhn (2016).

References

2016 in paleontology
Paleoentomology